USS Peconic (AOG-68), was a type T1  built for the US Navy during World War II. She was named after the Peconic River, in New York.

Construction
Peconic was laid down on 31 January 1945, under a Maritime Commission (MARCOM) contract, MC hull 2628, by the St. Johns River Shipbuilding Company, Jacksonville, Florida; sponsored by Mrs. Mal Haughton, Jr.; acquired on a loan basis by the Navy 28 September 1945; and commissioned 29 September 1945.

Service history
Peconic reported to Commander Service Force Atlantic at Norfolk, Virginia, 27 November. Because of reduced need following the war's end, she decommissioned 4 January 1946, at the Norfolk Naval Shipyard, was struck from the Navy List 21 January, and returned to the Maritime Commission (MARCOM).

She went into merchant service in 1946, as SS Voshell operated by the Maritime Transport Lines Inc. until 4 April 1948, at which time she was turned over to the Naval Transportation Service (NTS) as USNT Peconic (AOG-68) at Boston. Maritime Transport Lines Inc. continued to operate Peconic under contract for the NTS. NTS became Military Sea Transportation Service (MSTS) 1 October 1949, and the ship was then designated USNS Peconic (AOG-68).

Peconic was reinstated to the Naval Vessel Register 28 April 1950, and she continued service in MSTS until 12 November 1957, when she transferred to the Maritime Administration (MARAD) National Defense Reserve Fleet at Beaumont, Texas. She was struck from the Naval Vessel Register the same day. On 27 July 1982, she was sold for scrapping to Andy Exports Inc., she was removed from the fleet on 7 December 1982.

References

Bibliography

External links 

 Auke Visser's Famous T - Tankers Pages
 

Klickitat-class gasoline tankers
Ships built in Jacksonville, Florida
1945 ships
Beaumont Reserve Fleet